The M4 is a long metropolitan route in the City of Cape Town Metropolitan Municipality in South Africa. It connects the Cape Town CBD with the Cape Peninsula via Wynberg, Muizenberg and Fish Hoek. Originally, it was the main route connecting the Cape Town CBD with the Southern Suburbs. From the CBD to Kirstenhof, it is parallel to the M3 Freeway.

Route 
The M4 begins at a junction with the M59 Route (Buitenkant Street) in District Six (Zonnebloem; east of the Cape Town City Centre), just north of the District Six Museum and just east of the Cape Town City Hall. It begins by heading eastwards as Sir Lowry Road to fly over the N2 Highway (Nelson Mandela Boulevard) and enter the Woodstock suburb. In Woodstock, it slowly turns towards the south and reaches the Cape Town Science Centre and Groote Schuur Hospital in Observatory, where it once again flies over the N2 Highway (Settlers Way).

It continues southwards as Main Road from the N2 overbridge for 18 kilometres, through Rondebosch, Newlands, Claremont, Kenilworth, Wynberg, Plumstead, Diep River, Bergvliet, Retreat and Kirstenhof, to bypass the Muizenberg Mountains and enter Muizenberg, where it meets the south-western terminus of the R310 Route (Baden Powell Drive). The M4 continues southwards with the False Bay coast to its east for 6 kilometres (still named Main Road) to reach Fish Hoek, where it meets the M65 Route at a roundabout.

The M4 continues following the coast southwards to reach Glencairn, where it meets the southern terminus of the M6 Route (an alternative route from the Cape Town CBD). The M4 proceeds southwards for 18 kilometres, through Simon's Town, to reach its end at another junction with the M65 Route in the Cape Peninsula, at the entrance of the Cape of Good Hope.

References 

Roads in Cape Town
Streets and roads of Cape Town
Metropolitan routes in Cape Town